Japan participated in the 2002 Asian Games held in Busan, South Korea from September 29, 2002 to October 14, 2002.
This country was ranked 3rd with 44 gold medals, 74 silver medals and 72 bronze medals with a total of 190 medals
to secure its third spot in the medal tally.

Participation details

List of medalists

Bronze medalists
Baseball -  *Nozomi Yamago *Yuka Miyazaki *Yoshie Kasajima *Yasuyo Yamagishi *Tomoe Sakai *Yumi Obe *Yayoi Kobayashi *Mai Nakachi *Tomomi Miyamoto *Homare Sawa *Mio Otani *Mai Aizawa *Kanako Ito *Mito Isaka *Naoko Kawakami *Miyuki Yanagita *Karina Maruyama *Miho Fukumoto
Football -  *Go Kida *Yohsuke Shinomiya *Kenta Kurihara *Kazunari Tsuruoka *Satoshi Kubota *Keiichi Hirano *Takeshi Koyama *Takayuki Gotoh *Hiroya Tani *Kazuhiro Semba *Koji Onuma *Koji Yamamoto *Kanehisa Arime *Masanori Yasuda *Toshiyuki Kitagawa *Shingo Maeda *Takashi Yoshiura *Kazuhiro Hatakeyama *Hisao Arakane *Shiro Teramoto *Katsuhiro Nishiura *Daisuke Mori

Baseball

group play

Football

Men's Tournament 
Grouplay 

Quarterfinals

Semifinals

Gold medal match

Field Hockey

Men's Tournament 

Grouplay

Women's Tournament

Judo

References

Nations at the 2002 Asian Games
2002
Asian Games